Egidio Notaristefano (born 4 February 1966) is an Italian football manager. He is a former Italy under-21 international midfielder.

Career
Notaristefano began his playing career at Como in the early 1980s, and he made his Serie A debut in 1984. He made his Italy under-21 debut against Austria on 12 November 1986 at Fontanafredda. He won 10 caps for the under-21s, and scored his only international goal against Switzerland at Neuchâtel on 16 October 1987.

Notaristefano left Como in 1990 to join Bologna, and he finished his career with spells at Lecce, Perugia, Alessandria, Meda and Pro Lissone.
Following his retirement, he managed the youth team of Legnano before being promoted to first-team manager in November 2007. He spent six months at Legnano before taking the manager's job at Novara in May 2008. He left the club in May 2009, and he joined SPAL in November 2009.
In March 2013 he replaced Giovanni Cusatis as manager of Alessandria.

References

1966 births
Living people
Footballers from Milan
Italian footballers
Italian football managers
Italy under-21 international footballers
Como 1907 players
Bologna F.C. 1909 players
U.S. Lecce players
A.C. Perugia Calcio players
U.S. Alessandria Calcio 1912 players
A.C. Legnano managers
Novara F.C. managers
U.S. Alessandria Calcio 1912 managers
A.C. Carpi managers
S.P.A.L. managers
Serie A players
Association football midfielders
A.C. Meda 1913 players